Veenendaal West is a railway station located in Veenendaal, Netherlands. The station was opened in 1981, and is located on the Kesteren–Amersfoort railway. The train services are operated by Nederlandse Spoorwegen.

Train services
The following services currently call at Veenendaal West:
2x per hour local service (sprinter) (Amsterdam -) Breukelen - Utrecht (- Veenendaal Centrum) (peak hours only)
2x per hour local service (sprinter) Breukelen - Utrecht - Rhenen

External links
NS website 
Dutch Public Transport journey planner 

Railway stations in Utrecht (province)
Railway stations opened in 1981
Veenendaal